Saksi may refer to:

Television/Media
 Saksi, a Philippine television late-night news broadcasting program of GMA Network.
 Saksi sa Dobol B, a Philippine morning news and talk program on DZBB-AM.
 Saksi Kunci, a Indonesian television crime news broadcasting program of Kompas TV.

People
Saksi Sbong, a Cambodian actress

Places
 Saksi, Estonia, a village in Tapa Parish, Lääne-Viru county, Estonia
 Saksi Parish, a rural municipality in Lääne-Viru county, Estonia
 Saksi (mountain), a mountain in Lom municipality in Innlandet county, Norway
 Saksı, Pasinler, a neighbourhood in the Pasinler District of Erzurum Province, Turkey